A handlebar moustache is a moustache with particularly lengthy and upwardly curved extremities. These moustache styles are named for their resemblance to the handlebars of a bicycle.  It is also known as a spaghetti moustache, because of its stereotypical association with Italian men.  The Handlebar Club humorously describes the style as "a hirsute appendage of the upper lip and with graspable extremities".

History
Similar styles of moustache are quite ancient, appearing on statues and other depictions of Iron Age Celts.  In the United States, handlebar moustaches were worn in the later part of the 19th century by Wild West figures like Wyatt Earp. In Europe, handlebar moustaches were often worn by soldiers during the 19th century until roughly the era of World War I.

English comedy actor Jimmy Edwards grew his trademark handlebar moustache in the late 1940s in order to disguise facial injuries sustained as a pilot in World War II.

In 1972, to win a $300 "best facial hair" prize offered by team owner Charlie O. Finley, Oakland A's pitcher Rollie Fingers grew a handlebar moustache which he sported throughout his career.

More recently, the contemporary hipster subculture has embraced the handlebar moustache by mocking conventional ideals of fashion, and by combining a highly manicured handlebar moustache with the portrayal of an unkempt appearance or a haphazardly selected clothing ensemble.

Famous handlebar moustaches

Company mascots
Geoff Ramsey
Julius Pringles
Mr. Monopoly
Mr. Boh
Air India's Maharaja mascot
Terrible Herbst

Styles
This style is usually achieved by the use of moustache wax, although hair gel, a curling iron, or natural curling can suffice. Generally, the greater the curl of the extremities, the more dramatic the appearance achieved.  When worn without wax or grooming, the moustache style may more closely resemble a walrus moustache.

See also

Handlebar Club
List of moustache styles
List of facial hairstyles

References

Moustache styles